Unusual Suspects: Deadly Intent is an American documentary television program on Investigation Discovery. The series debuted on October 4, 2017 and is both served as a Follow-Up and Sequel to Unusual Suspects.  Like its predecessor, the new program also showcases the intricate investigations that led to the arrest of unusual killers – people who most of the time never even had a police record – and how those cases were complicated and challenging even for experienced people working in law enforcement.

Production
In 2016, LMNO Cable Group, the company responsible for producing Unusual Suspects since its inception, accused Discovery of taking advantage of financial crimes to steal TLC's The Little Couple. The imbroglio resulted in Discovery cancelling all contracts with LMNO, including Unusual Suspects, on June 17, 2016.

Despite claims from some online sources that Deadly Intent is the ninth season of the cancelled Unusual Suspects, Investigation Discovery officially presents it on its website as a new program on its first season.

Episodes

References

External links

2017 American television series debuts
Investigation Discovery original programming
True crime television series
2017 American television series endings